Rhigognostis incarnatella, the Scotch smudge, is a moth of the family Plutellidae. It was described by Wilhelm Steudel in 1873. It is found in most of Europe.

The wingspan is 17–21 mm. Adults are on wing from September to April in one generation per year, overwintering by hiding in thick cover.

The larvae feed on Hesperis matronalis, Cardamine bulbifera, Sisymbrium, Alliaria and Cheiranthus species form beneath a silken web.

References

 "Rhigognostis incarnatella (Steudel, 1873)". Insecta.pro. Retrieved 16 August 2019.

External links
lepiforum.de

Moths described in 1873
Plutellidae
Moths of Europe